Joseph Russell (1800 – April 24, 1875) was an American politician who served as a U.S. Representative from New York's 12th congressional district from 1845 to 1847 and again from 1851 to 1853.

Early life
Russell was born in Warrensburg, New York in 1800.

Career 
Russell became active in several businesses, including lumbering and part-ownership of the Warrensburg House Hotel. Russell was also a founder of Warrensburg's Masonic Lodge.

Political career 
A Democrat, Russell served as Town Supervisor in 1830, 1835 and 1840. He was Warren County Sheriff from November 1834 to November 1837, and served in the New York State Assembly in 1840.

Congress 
Russell was elected to the 29th Congress (March 4, 1845 – March 3, 1847). He returned to the House as a member of the 32nd Congress (March 4, 1851 – March 3, 1853).

Later career 
He later moved to Glens Falls, where he was a founder of the First National Bank of Glens Falls and became active in the Glens Falls Masonic Lodge.

Death 
Russell died in Glens Falls on April 24, 1875. He was buried at Glens Falls Cemetery.

Sources

1800 births
1875 deaths
People from Warrensburg, New York
Politicians from Glens Falls, New York
Town supervisors in New York (state)
New York (state) sheriffs
Democratic Party members of the New York State Assembly
Democratic Party members of the United States House of Representatives from New York (state)
19th-century American politicians